Scythris is a genus of gelechioid moths. It is the type genus of the flower moth family, which is sometimes included as a subfamily in the Xyloryctidae, or together with these merged into the Oecophoridae. The genus was erected by Jacob Hübner in 1825.

It is the largest  genus of flower moths, and as such might not be fully monophyletic with regard to some very small or monotypic genera placed in the same family. In addition, new species of Scythris continue to be discovered and described.

Selected species

Species groups
The species of Scythris have been divided among several groups, which may or may not be monophyletic; those that are may – provided they are closely enough related to the type species S. limbella – be considered subgenera. There is a considerable number of species whose exact relationships are hitherto elusive. Some have been placed in a "Monospecific species group" of their own, as they are too distinct from the other groups to be included there, yet at the same time have characteristic autapomorphies. Species groups include:
<div float="left">

aenea group Scythris aenea Passerin d'Entrèves 1984aerariella group Scythris adustella Jäckh, 1978
 Scythris aerariella (Herrich-Schäffer, 1855)
 Scythris anomaloptera (Staudinger, 1880)
 Scythris binotiferella (Ragonot, 1880)
 Scythris brummanae Passerin d'Entrèves & Roggero, 2012
 Scythris carboniella Jäckh, 1978
 Scythris corsa Passerin d'Entrèves, 1986
 Scythris dorycniella (Milliére, 1861)
 Scythris flaviventrella (Herrich-Schäffer, 1855)
 Scythris hungaricella Rebel, 1917
 Scythris imperiella Jäckh, 1978
 Scythris jaeckhi Bengtsson, 1989
 Scythris lhommei Bengtsson & Passerin d'Entrèves, 1988
 Scythris parnassiae Bengtsson, 1997
 Scythris popescugorji Passerin d'Entrèves, 1984
 Scythris ridiculella Caradja, 1920
 Scythris tergestinella (Zeller, 1855)
 Scythris tumidella K. & T.Nupponen, 2001alseriella group Scythris alseriella (Turati, 1879)
 Scythris fasciatella (Ragonot, 1880)Australian group Scythris adelopa Meyrick, 1897
 Scythris celidopa Meyrick, 1921
 Scythris ceratocosma Meyrick, 1897
 Scythris crypsigramma Meyrick, 1897
 Scythris detestata Meyrick, 1922
 Scythris diatoma (Turner, 1927)
 Scythris erebospila Meyrick, 1897
 Scythris fumida Turner, 1923
 Scythris hologramma (Lower, 1899)
 Scythris leucochyta (Turner, 1947)
 Scythris paredra Meyrick, 1897
 Scythris pleonectis Meyrick, 1897
 Scythris plocanota Meyrick, 1897
 Scythris praestructa Meyrick, 1922
 Scythris rhabducha Meyrick, 1897
 Scythris sporadica Meyrick, 1897
 Scythris xenonympha (Lower, 1900)bagdadiella group Scythris bagdadiella Amsel, 1949
 Scythris caballoides Nupponen, 2009
 Scythris kabulella Passerin d'Entrèves & Roggero, 2011
 Scythris semifascia Nupponen, 2010
 Scythris tugaiensis Nupponen, 2009bazaensis group Scythris bazaensis Bengtsson, 1997boseanella group Scythris boseanella Klimesch, 1986camelella group Scythris camelella Walsingham, 1907canescens group Scythris angustella Nupponen, 2009
 Scythris appendicella Bengtsson, 1997
 Scythris articulatella Chrétien, 1915
 Scythris barbatella Chrétien, 1915
 Scythris biskraensis Bengtsson, 1997
 Scythris canescens (Staudinger, 1880)
 Scythris cupellella Bengtsson, 1997
 Scythris curlettii Bengtsson, 1997
 Scythris deserticola Nupponen, 2010
 Scythris eremella Chrétien, 1915
 Scythris eucharis Walsingham, 1907
 Scythris falkovitshi Nupponen, 2009
 Scythris karvoneni Nupponen, 2010
 Scythris maculosa Bengtsson, 1997
 Scythris neftae Bengtsson, 1997
 Scythris pura Walsingham, 1907
 Scythris senecai Bengtsson, 1997
 Scythris tessulatella Rebel, 1903caramani group Scythris albisaxella K. & T.Nupponen, 2000
 Scythris arkaimensis Bengtsson, 2000
 Scythris caramani Staudinger, 1880
 Scythris cervella K. & T.Nupponen, 2001
 Scythris cultelloides Nupponen & Sinev, 2011
 Scythris eevae Nupponen, 2007
 Scythris erinacella Nupponen, 2003
 Scythris gorbunovi Nupponen, 2003
 Scythris hamatella K. & T.Nupponen, 2001
 Scythris hebesella Nupponen, 2005
 Scythris kullbergi Bengtsson, 1997
 Scythris lagomorphella Nupponen, 2002
 Scythris malozemovi Nupponen, 2003
 Scythris marashi Passerin d'Entrèves & Roggero, 2012
 Scythris sinevi Nupponen, 2003cicadella group Scythris arenbergeri Passerin d'Entrèves, 1986
 Scythris bajanlegi Passerin d'Entrèves & Roggero, 2006
 Scythris cicadella (Zeller, 1839)
 Scythris latilineella K. Nupponen, 2013
 Scythris moldavicella Caradja, 1905 (= S. balcanica)
 Scythris potentillella (Zeller, 1847)
 Scythris ventosella Chrétien 1907cistorum group
 Scythris cistorum (Milliére, 1876)
 Scythris nieukerkeni Bengtsson, 1989
 Scythris rondaensis Bengtsson, 1997'crassiuscula group Scythris crassiuscula (Herrich-Schäffer, 1855)crypta group Scythris crypta Hannemann 1961decrepidella group Scythris decrepidella Bengtsson, 1997
 Scythris goundafae Bengtsson, 1997dissitella group Scythris dissitella (Zeller, 1847)elenae group Scythris elenae K.Nupponen, 2000
 Scythris juerivetei Nupponen, 2005empetrella group Scythris empetrella Karsholt & Nielsen 1976
 Scythris gozmanyi Passerin d'Entrèves 1986fallacella group Scythris baldensis Passerin d'Entrèves 1979
 Scythris fallacella (Schläger 1847)
 Scythris larzacensis Delmas, 2010
 Scythris oelandicella Müller-Rutz 1922
 Scythris sappadensis Bengtsson, 1992
 Scythris tremalzoi Bengtsson, 1992formicella group Scythris formicella Chrétien, 1915
 Scythris kebiliensis Bengtsson, 1997
 Scythris minima Bengtsson, 1997fuscoaenea group Scythris derrai Bengtsson, 1991
 Scythris dissimilella (Herrich-Schäffer, 1855)
 Scythris fuscoaenea (Haworth, 1828)
 Scythris parafuscoaenea Bengtsson, 1991
 Scythris tabelli Junnilainen, 2002
 Scythris tenuivittella (Stainton, 1867)
 Scythris traugotti Bengtsson, 1991
 Scythris vartianae Kasy, 1962
 Scythris vittella (O.Costa, 1834)fuscopterella group Scythris fuscopterella Bengtsson 1977gobiensis group Scythris gobiensis Passerin d'Entrèves & Roggero, 2006grandipennis group Scythris bornicensis Jäckh, 1977
 Scythris constanti Walsingham, 1898
 Scythris cupreella (Staudinger, 1859)
 Scythris ericetella (Heinemann, 1872)
 Scythris grandipennis (Haworth, 1828)
 Scythris kasyi Hannemann, 1962
 Scythris maroccensis Jäckh, 1977
 Scythris nevadensis Passerin d'Entrèves, 1990
 Scythris salviella Meess, 1910
 Scythris scipionella (Staudinger, 1859)
 Scythris scorpionella Jäckh, 1977
 Scythris siculella Jäckh, 1977
 Scythris tabidella (Herrich-Schäffer, 1855)gravatella group Scythris gravatella (Zeller, 1847)iagella group Scythris iagella Chrétien 1925inclusella group Scythris inclusella (Lederer, 1855)inertella group Scythris ethmiella Amsel, 1974
 Scythris inertella (Zeller, 1855)
 Scythris xanthopygella (Staudinger, 1859)inspersella group Scythris inspersella (Hübner, [1817])insulella ("ericivorella") group Scythris ericivorella (Ragonot, 1880)
 Scythris insulella (Staudinger, 1859)karinae group Scythris karinae Bengtsson 1991karsholti group Scythris karsholti Bengtsson, 1997klimeschi group Scythris guimarensis Bengtsson, 1997
 Scythris klimeschi Passerin d'Entrèves, 1983knochella group Scythris ambustella Bengtsson, 1997
 Scythris aspromontis Jäckh, 1978
 Scythris ciliatella Zerny, 1936
 Scythris heinemanni
 Scythris iberica Jäckh, 1978
 Scythris knochella (Fabricius, 1794)
 Scythris reticulella Nupponen, 2010
 Scythris schawerdae Rebel, 1931
 Scythris setiella (Zeller, 1870)
 Scythris staudingeri Jäckh, 1978laminella group Scythris andersi Bengtsson, 1991
 Scythris bolognella Jäckh, 1978
 Scythris braschiella (O.Hofmann, 1897)
 Scythris bubaniae Walsingham, 1907
 Scythris danilevskyi Nupponen & Sinev, 2011
 Scythris eberhardi Bengtsson, 1997
 Scythris frankeniella Chrétien, 1916
 Scythris kailai Bengtsson, 1997
 Scythris laminella (Denis & Schiffermüller, 1775)
 Scythris saxella Bengtsson, 1991
 Scythris thomisioides Bengtsson, 1997limbella group – possibly subgenus Scythris
 Scythris elegantella (D.Lucas, 1955)
 Scythris limbellalobella group Scythris lobella K. Nupponen, 2013mariannae group Scythris mariannae (Bengtsson, 1997)martini group Scythris bengtbengtssoni Vives, 1994
 Scythris martini Bengtsson, 1991meanderis group Scythris meanderis Bengtsson, 1997monochreella group Scythris monochreella (Ragonot, 1896)mus group Scythris mus Walsingham, 1898nigrella group Scythris nigrella Jäckh, 1978nipholecta group Scythris nipholecta Meyrick, 1924noricella group Scythris noricella (Zeller, 1843)obscurella group – possibly subgenus Galanthia
 Scythris amphonycella (Geyer, [1836])
 Scythris bengtssoni Patocka & Liska, 1989
 Scythris cuspidella (Denis & Schiffermüller, 1775)
 Scythris flavilaterella (Fuchs, 1886)
 Scythris hornigii (Zeller, 1855)
 Scythris lampyrella (Constant, 1865)
 Scythris mediella (Constant, 1855)
 Scythris obscurella (Scopoli, 1763)
 Scythris rouxella (Constant 1865) (sometimes in C. hornigii, tentatively placed here)
 Scythris speyeri (Heinemann & Wocke, 1876)
 Scythris shafferi Bengtsson, 2005
 Scythris abruptella Sachkov, 2013palustris group Scythris palustris (Zeller, 1855)pascuella group Scythris aciella Bengtsson, 1997
 Scythris albidella (Stainton, 1867)
 Scythris albosuffusella Nupponen, 2007
 Scythris barguzinensis Bengtsson & Liska, 1996
 Scythris bidzilyai Sachkov, 2013
 Scythris bifissella (O.Hofmann, 1889)
 Scythris caroxylella Falkovitsh, 1969
 Scythris claudiae Passerin d'Entrèves & Roggero, 2011
 Scythris cornuella Bengtsson, 1997
 Scythris cramella Nupponen, 2010
 Scythris flavidella Preissecker, 1911
 Scythris fluxilis Falkovitsh, 1986
 Scythris hemicycliella Nupponen, 2005
 Scythris kantarae Bengtsson, 1997
 Scythris karinupponei Bengtsson, 2000
 Scythris lagunae Jäckh, 1978
 Scythris mikkolai Sinev, 1993
 Scythris nigridorsella Nupponen, 2007
 Scythris orientella Sinev, 2001
 Scythris pascuella (Zeller, 1855)
 Scythris paullella (Herrich-Schäffer, 1855)
 Scythris perlucidella K. & T.Nupponen, 2000
 Scythris pudorinella (Möschler, 1866)
 Scythris rotundella Nupponen, 2010
 Scythris satyrella Staudinger, 1880
 Scythris subaerariella (Stainton, 1867)
 Scythris tabescentella (Staudinger, 1880)passerini group Scythris passerini (Bengtsson, 1997)penicillata group Scythris buraetica Nupponen, 2007
 Scythris penicillata (Chrétien 1900)
 Scythris spinella K. & T.Nupponen, 2001petrella group Scythris arachnodes Walsingham, 1908
 Scythris hierroella Klimesch, 1986
 Scythris petrella Walsingham, 1908
 Scythris pseudoarachnodes Bengtsson, 1997picaepennis group Scythris disparella (Tengström, 1848)
 Scythris picaepennis (Haworth, 1828)pinker group Scythris pinkeri Klimesch, 1986platypyga group Scythris platypyga (Staudinger, 1880)podoliensis group Scythris podoliensis Rebel, 1938polycarpaeae group Scythris polycarpaeae Klimesch, 1986productella group Scythris nielseni Passerin d'Entrèves & Roggero, 2003
 Scythris productella (Zeller, 1839)pulicella group Scythris antisymmetrica Nupponen, 2009
 Scythris apotomella Nupponen, 2007
 Scythris azrouensis Bengtsson, 1997
 Scythris corleyi Bengtsson, 1997
 Scythris langohri Passerin d'Entrèves, 1990
 Scythris pilella Bengtsson, 1991
 Scythris pulicella (Staudinger, 1859)
 Scythris skulei Bengtsson, 1997
 Scythris veletae Passerin d'Entrèves, 1990punctivittella group Scythris albostriata Hannemann, 1961
 Scythris apicistrigella (Staudinger, 1870)
 Scythris atlasensis Bengtsson, 1997
 Scythris confluens (Staudinger, 1870)
 Scythris cycladeae Jäckh, 1978
 Scythris emichi (Anker, 1870)
 Scythris landryi Passerin d'Entrèves & Roggero, 2003
 Scythris punctivittella (O.Costa, 1836)
 Scythris trinacriae Passerin d'Entrèves 1984rubioi group Scythris rubioi Agenjo, 1962 – possibly subgenus Rubioiaschleichiella group Scythris glacialis (Frey, 1870)
 Scythris gratiosella Jäckh, 1978
 Scythris schleichiella (Zeller, 1870)
 Scythris similis Hannemann, 1961
 Scythris subschleichiella Hannemann, 1961scopolella group Scythris apicalis (Zeller, 1847)
 Scythris flabella (Mann, 1861)
 Scythris scopolellaseliniella group Scythris acarioides Bengtsson, 1997
 Scythris clavella (Zeller, 1855)
 Scythris seliniella (Zeller, 1839)
 Scythris subseliniella (Heinemann, 1876)
 Scythris villari Agenjo, 1971siccella group Scythris lafauryi Passerin d'Entrèves 1986
 Scythris lempkei Bengtsson & Langohr, 1989
 Scythris siccella (Zeller, 1839)
 Scythris subsiccella Bengtsson, 1997sinensis group Scythris sinensis (Felder & Rogenhofer, 1875)subfasciata group Scythris anthracodes Walsingham, 1907
 Scythris friedeli Bengtsson, 1997
 Scythris levantina Passerin d'Entrèves & Vives, 1990
 Scythris locustella Chrétien, 1915
 Scythris pototskii Nupponen, 2005
 Scythris pseudolocustella Passerin d'Entrèves & Vives, 1990
 Scythris subfasciata (Staudinger, 1880)tributella group Scythris tributella (Zeller, 1847)unquisella group Scythris unquisella Bengtsson, 2005? species group' Scythris herati Passerin d'Entrèves & Roggero, 2003
 Scythris tauromeniella Passerin d'Entrèves & Roggero, 2003

</div>

Species incertae sedis
Finally, there are many species which are neither clearly assignable to any one species group, nor autapomorphic enough to be included in a monospecific "group". These include:
 Scythris abyanensis Bengtsson, 2002
 Scythris accumulata Meyrick, 1914
 Scythris achyropa Meyrick, 1916
 Scythris acipenserella K. & T.Nupponen, 2000
 Scythris acusella Passerin d'Entrèves & Roggero, 2012
 Scythris adelopa Meyrick, 1897
 Scythris aegrella K. Nupponen & Junnilainen, 2000
 Scythris albiangulella Bengtsson, 2002
 Scythris albipuncta Turner, 1939
 Scythris albocanella Bengtsson, 2002
 Scythris albogrammella Bengtsson, 2002
 Scythris alborzensis Passerin d'Entrèves & Roggero, 2011
 Scythris alceella Junnilainen, 2002
 Scythris alhamrae Bengtsson, 2002
 Scythris amplexella Bengtsson, 2002
 Scythris ampullella Passerin d'Entrèves & Roggero, 2012
 Scythris anchophylli Falkovitsh, 1969
 Scythris ancystra Bucheli, 2005
 Scythris anthracina Braun, 1923
 Scythris anthracodelta Meyrick, 1911
 Scythris aquaria Meyrick, 1913
 Scythris arenicola K.Nupponen, 2005
 Scythris arerai Huemer, 2000
 Scythris aristidella Rebel, 1902
 Scythris astragali Falkovitsh, 1969
 Scythris atascosa (Landry, 1991)
 Scythris atollicola Nupponen & Saldaitis, 2013
 Scythris autochlorella Paulian & Viette, 1955
 Scythris axenopa Meyrick, 1918
 Scythris balanophora Meyrick, 1916
 Scythris balkhi Passerin d'Entrèves & Roggero, 2008
 Scythris balli (Landry, 1991)
 Scythris basilaris (Zeller, 1855)
 Scythris basilicella Bengtsson, 2002
 Scythris basistrigella (Staudinger, 1880)
 Scythris beccella Bengtsson, 2002
 Scythris bernardlandryi Bucheli, 2005
 Scythris biacutella Bengtsson, 2002
 Scythris bicuspidella Bengtsson, 2002
 Scythris bifasciella Passerin d'Entrèves & Roggero, 2011
 Scythris bifractella (Rebel, 1917)
 Scythris bispinella Bengtsson, 2002
 Scythris brachyplecta Meyrick, 1928
 Scythris brandti Passerin d'Entrèves & Roggero, 2008
 Scythris brunneofasciella K. Nupponen & Junnilainen, 2000
 Scythris buszkoi Baran, 2003
 Scythris canceroides Bengtsson, 1997
 Scythris canella Bengtsson, 2002
 Scythris capitalis (Erschoff, 1874)
 Scythris capnofasciae Bengtsson, 2002
 Scythris cassiterella (Snellen, 1884) (= S. baikalensis)
 Scythris celidopa Meyrick, 1921
 Scythris ceratella Bengtsson, 2002
 Scythris ceratocosma Meyrick, 1897
 Scythris charon Meyrick, 1918
 Scythris chelota Meyrick, 1906
 Scythris chloraema (Meyrick, 1887)
 Scythris chrysopygella Caradja, 1927
 Scythris cinisella Bengtsson, 2002
 Scythris cirra Falkovitsh, 1969<
 Scythris clemens Meyrick, 1921
 Scythris cometa Meyrick, 1909
 Scythris commota Meyrick, 1918
 Scythris complexa Sinev, 2001
 Scythris concurrens Meyrick, 1921
 Scythris consimilella Bengtsson, 2002
 Scythris cretacella K. & T.Nupponen, 2000
 Scythris cretiflua Meyrick, 1913
 Scythris crypsigramma Meyrick, 1897
 Scythris cucullella Bengtsson, 2002
 Scythris culmicola Meyrick, 1916
 Scythris cuneata Bucheli, 2005
 Scythris cuneatella Bengtsson, 2002
 Scythris curvipilella Bengtsson, 2002
 Scythris darwini Bucheli, 2005
 Scythris delodelta Meyrick, 1930
 Scythris denticolor Walsingham, 1900
 Scythris deplanata Meyrick, 1928
 Scythris depressa Meyrick, 1931
 Scythris deprinsi Bengtsson, 2005
 Scythris deresella Falkovitsh, 1969
 Scythris detestata Meyrick, 1922
 Scythris diatoma (Turner, 1927)
 Scythris dicroa Falkovitsh, 1972
 Scythris digitibasella Nupponen & Saldaitis, 2013
 Scythris dimensa Meyrick, 1920
 Scythris dimota Meyrick, 1931
 Scythris discimaculella Rebel, 1936
 Scythris distactica Meyrick, 1921
 Scythris divaricata Braun, 1923
 Scythris divergens Bengtsson, 2005
 Scythris dividua Meyrick, 1916
 Scythris durandella (Lucas, 1949)
 Scythris eboracensis (Zeller, 1855)
 Scythris eburnea (Walsingham, 1888)
 Scythris ejiciens Meyrick, 1928

 Scythris elachistoides Bengtsson, 2002
 Scythris elburzi Passerin d'Entrèves & Roggero, 2008
 Scythris eloquens Meyrick, 1921
 Scythris epistrota (Meyrick, 1889)
 Scythris erebospila Meyrick, 1897
 Scythris erinacella Nupponen, 2003
 Scythris eversmanni K. & T. Nupponen, 2000
 Scythris expolita Meyrick, 1910
 Scythris exsoluta Meyrick, 1920
 Scythris faeculenta Meyrick, 1912
 Scythris falcata Bucheli, 2005
 Scythris farrata Meyrick, 1913
 Scythris farsi Passerin d'Entrèves & Roggero, 2009
 Scythris fasciata Falkovitsh, 1969
 Scythris felesella Bengtsson, 1997
 Scythris felixi Bengtsson & Sutter, 1996
 Scythris fibigeri Bengtsson, 2002
 Scythris fissurella Bengtsson, 1996
 Scythris fluvialis Meyrick, 1916
 Scythris fonticola Meyrick, 1911
 Scythris formidabilis (Landry, 1991)
 Scythris fumida Turner, 1923
 Scythris furculata Bucheli, 2005
 Scythris fuscicomella (Clemens, 1860)
 Scythris galapagosensis Bucheli, 2005
 Scythris galeatella Bengtsson, 2002
 Scythris ganesha Nupponen & Sinev, 2011
 Scythris garciapitai Vives, 2001
 Scythris ghaemii Bengtsson & Huemer, 2003
 Scythris gladiella K. & T.Nupponen, 2004
 Scythris glaphyropa Meyrick, 1914
 Scythris glyphidota Meyrick, 1916
 Scythris gratifica Meyrick, 1921
 Scythris halmyrodes Meyrick, 1921
 Scythris halophiliella Amsel, 1935
 Scythris haloxylella Falkovitsh, 1969
 Scythris hemidictyas Meyrick, 1928
 Scythris hamardabanica Nupponen, 2003
 Scythris heikkii Nupponen, 2007
 Scythris hologramma (Lower, 1899)
 Scythris hostilis Nupponen, 2005
 Scythris hyalinella Caradja, 1920
 Scythris hydronoma Meyrick, 1930
 Scythris hymenata (Landry, 1991)
 Scythris ianitella Nupponen, 2005
 Scythris iconiensis Rebel, 1902
 Scythris ilyopa Meyrick, 1921
 Scythris immaculatella (Chambers, 1875)
 Scythris immunis Meyrick, 1916
 Scythris inanima Meyrick, 1916
 Scythris inconspicuella Sinev, 2001
 Scythris indigoferivora Bengtsson, 2002
 Scythris ingens Nupponen, 2005
 Scythris inornatella (Chambers, 1880)
 Scythris interrupta Braun, 1920
 Scythris invisa Meyrick, 1920
 Scythris iterella Bengtsson, 2002
 Scythris jakutica Sinev, 2001
 Scythris jalavai Sinev, 1993
 Scythris jemenensis Bengtsson, 2002
 Scythris justifica Meyrick, 1911
 Scythris karini Bengtsson, 1991
 Scythris kaszabi Passerin d'Entrèves & Roggero, 2006
 Scythris kaschmirica Bengtsson, 2005
 Scythris kefensis Nupponen, 2001
 Scythris kolachii Passerin d'Entrèves & Roggero, 2012
 Scythris kyzylensis Bengtsson, 1997
 Scythris lactanea Meyrick, 1913
 Scythris lamprochalca Meyrick, 1931
 Scythris latebrosa Meyrick, 1913
 Scythris lativalvella Sinev, 2001
 Scythris lativittis Gerasimov, 1930
 Scythris leucochyta (Turner, 1947)
 Scythris libanotica Jäckh, 1978
 Scythris linnavuorii Bengtsson, 2005
 Scythris longissima (Landry, 1991)
 Scythris luxatiella K.Nupponen & Kaitila, 2000
 Scythris lycii Falkovitsh, 1969
 Scythris macrourella Sinev, 2001
 Scythris medullata Meyrick, 1916
 Scythris melanodora Meyrick, 1912
 Scythris meraula Meyrick, 1916
 Scythris mesoplecta Meyrick, 1921
 Scythris minorella Sinev, 2001
 Scythris mixaula Meyrick, 1916
 Scythris nanophyti Falkovitsh, 1979
 Scythris neocompsa (Meyrick, 1933)
 Scythris nepalensis Bengtsson, 2005
 Scythris neurogramma Walsingham, 1900
 Scythris nigra Philpott, 1931
 Scythris nigrispersa Meyrick, 1918
 Scythris nigrogrammella Bengtsson, 2002
 Scythris nigropterella Bengtsson, 2002
 Scythris ninae Nupponen, 2003
 Scythris niphozela Meyrick, 1931
 Scythris nitidella Bengtsson & Liska, 1996
 Scythris nivicolor Meyrick, 1916
 Scythris notorrhoa Meyrick, 1921
 Scythris obliqua Falkovitsh, 1969
 Scythris ochrantha Meyrick, 1909
 Scythris ochrea Walsingham, 1896
 Scythris ochrogramma Meyrick, 1916
 Scythris olschwangi K. & T.Nupponen, 2000
 Scythris onerica Nupponen, 2009

 Scythris orientella Sinev, 2001
 Scythris oxyplecta Meyrick, 1916
 Scythris paelopyga Staudinger, 1880
 Scythris pallidella Passerin d'Entrèves & Roggero, 2006
 Scythris pamirica Passerin d'Entrèves & Roggero, 2008
 Scythris pangalactis Meyrick, 1933
 Scythris parachalca Meyrick, 1916
 Scythris parafluxilis Passerin d'Entrèves & Roggero, 2007
 Scythris paralogella Bengtsson, 2002
 Scythris paredra Meyrick, 1897
 Scythris parenthesella Bengtsson, 2002
 Scythris patiens Meyrick, 1921
 Scythris pectinicornis Walsingham, 1900
 Scythris pelinaula Meyrick, 1916
 Scythris pelochyta Meyrick, 1909
 Scythris persephone Meyrick, 1936
 Scythris pfeifferella Rebel, 1936
 Scythris pilosella (Zeller, 1873)
 Scythris pistillata Bucheli, 2005
 Scythris piratica Meyrick, 1928
 Scythris pleonectis Meyrick, 1897
 Scythris plocanota Meyrick, 1897
 Scythris plocogastra Meyrick, 1931
 Scythris plutelloidella Turati, 1934
 Scythris poliantha Meyrick, 1921
 Scythris pollicella Bengtsson, 2002
 Scythris potatorella Nupponen, 2003
 Scythris powelli (Landry, 1991)
 Scythris praematura Meyrick, 1937
 Scythris praestructa Meyrick, 1922
 Scythris pruinata Falkovitsh, 1972
 Scythris pterosaurella Bengtsson, 2002
 Scythris reflectella Bengtsson, 2002
 Scythris remexella K. Nupponen & Kaitila, 2000
 Scythris rhabducha Meyrick, 1897
 Scythris richteri Bengtsson, 2013
 Scythris rivigera Meyrick, 1911
 Scythris roseola Meyrick, 1912
 Scythris saarelai K. & T.Nupponen, 1999
 Scythris sacharissa Meyrick, 1913
 Scythris sachkovi Passerin d'Entrèves & Roggero, 2006
 Scythris sagitatella Erschoff, [1877]
 Scythris sanae Bengtsson, 2002
 Scythris sciochalca Meyrick, 1928
 Scythris scotinopa Meyrick, 1935
 Scythris scutulella Nupponen, 2013
 Scythris scyphella Bengtsson, 2002
 Scythris sibirella Sinev, 2001
 Scythris sinuosa Bucheli, 2005
 Scythris sinuosella Bengtsson, 2002
 Scythris sitarcha Meyrick, 1918
 Scythris strabella Bengtsson, 2002
 Scythris solitaria Diakonoff, 1955
 Scythris soluta Meyrick, 1916
 Scythris sophronia Meyrick, 1935
 Scythris sordidella Bengtsson, 2002
 Scythris spectatorella Nupponen, 2001
 Scythris spissata Meyrick, 1916
 Scythris sponsella (Busck, 1907)
 Scythris sporadica Meyrick, 1897
 Scythris spumifera Meyrick, 1918
 Scythris stagnosa Meyrick, 1913
 Scythris striella Turati, 1929
 Scythris subcassiterella Bengtsson, 1997
 Scythris subclavella Rebel, 1901
 Scythris subeburnea (Walsingham, 1891)
 Scythris subgaleatella Bengtsson, 2002
 Scythris sublaminella K. & T.Nupponen, 2000
 Scythris subparachalca Bengtsson, 2002
 Scythris subsignata Meyrick, 1916
 Scythris syrmatica Meyrick, 1916
 Scythris taizzae Bengtsson, 2002
 Scythris talyniella Passerin d'Entrèves & Roggero, 2006
 Scythris taurella Caradja, 1920
 Scythris tauromeniella Passerin d'Entrèves & Roggero, 2004
 Scythris taygeticola Scholz, 1997
 Scythris tenuisquamata Staudinger, 1880
 Scythris tephrella Bengtsson, 2005
 Scythris terekholensis Bengtsson, 1997
 Scythris tibicina Meyrick, 1916
 Scythris timoi Nupponen, 2009
 Scythris triatma Meyrick, 1936
 Scythris trinummulata Meyrick, 1922
 Scythris triochrias Meyrick, 1916
 Scythris trivinctella (Zeller, 1873)
 Scythris tsherkesella Falkovitsh, 1969
 Scythris turanica Nupponen, 2009
 Scythris tuzensis Bengtsson, 2005
 Scythris tytrella Falkovitsh, 1969
 Scythris unimaculella Rebel, 1905
 Scythris ustjuzhanini Sachkov & Sinev, 2001
 Scythris valgella Bengtsson, 2002
 Scythris valvaearcella Bengtsson, 2002
 Scythris vernusella Jäckh, 1978
 Scythris vogelfederbergensis (Mey, 2011)
 Scythris xenonympha (Lower, 1900)
 Scythris xylinochra Meyrick, 1931
 Scythris ypsilon Braun, 1920
 Scythris wadiqeltella Passerin d'Entrèves & Roggero, 2013
 Scythris zelleri (Staudinger, 1880)
 Scythris zeugmatica Meyrick, 1931

Afrotropical

 Scythris aarviki Bengtsson, 2014
 Scythris abachausensis Bengtsson, 2014
 Scythris agassizi Bengtsson, 2014
 Scythris alainensis Bengtsson, 2014
 Scythris albipunctella Bengtsson, 2014
 Scythris albonigrella Bengtsson, 2014
 Scythris anaecapitella Bengtsson, 2014
 Scythris apicispinella Bengtsson, 2014
 Scythris aratrella Bengtsson, 2014
 Scythris asinella Bengtsson, 2014
 Scythris atroparvella Bengtsson, 2014
 Scythris aulaeella Bengtsson, 2014
 Scythris balantiella Bengtsson, 2014
 Scythris baringensis Bengtsson, 2014
 Scythris basimaculella Bengtsson, 2014
 Scythris bernardi Bengtsson, 2014
 Scythris bicalamella Bengtsson, 2014
 Scythris bipunctella Bengtsson, 2014
 Scythris bisacculella Bengtsson, 2014
 Scythris bisincusella Bengtsson, 2014
 Scythris bitterfonteinica Bengtsson, 2014
 Scythris bjoernstadi Bengtsson, 2014
 Scythris bontebokensis Bengtsson, 2014
 Scythris bosicornella Bengtsson, 2014
 Scythris brandbergensis Bengtsson, 2014
 Scythris brevimanubriella Bengtsson, 2014
 Scythris bromiella Bengtsson, 2014
 Scythris brunneostriella Bengtsson, 2014
 Scythris budongensis Bengtsson, 2014
 Scythris capilliverticella Bengtsson, 2014
 Scythris catuliformis Bengtsson, 2014
 Scythris cederbergensis Bengtsson, 2014
 Scythris clarki Bengtsson, 2014
 Scythris claudioculella Bengtsson, 2014
 Scythris conimarginella Bengtsson, 2014
 Scythris coniobliquella Bengtsson, 2014
 Scythris cooperi Bengtsson, 2014
 Scythris coriella Bengtsson, 2014
 Scythris cottrelli Bengtsson, 2014
 Scythris cricetinaeformis Bengtsson, 2014
 Scythris davidi Bengtsson, 2014
 Scythris dicksoni Bengtsson, 2014
 Scythris dorsifuscella Bengtsson, 2014
 Scythris durbanensis Bengtsson, 2014
 Scythris eburiplicella Bengtsson, 2014
 Scythris eburnella Bengtsson, 2014
 Scythris eburnipterella Bengtsson, 2014
 Scythris ellipsiella Bengtsson, 2014
 Scythris enigmella Bengtsson, 2014
 Scythris ethiopica Bengtsson, 2014
 Scythris etoshensis Bengtsson, 2014
 Scythris falciformis Bengtsson, 2014
 Scythris flavoterminella Bengtsson, 2014

 Scythris fumarolella Bengtsson, 2014
 Scythris gaboronensis Bengtsson, 2014
 Scythris geminella Bengtsson, 2014
 Scythris gielisi Bengtsson, 2014
 Scythris gilgilensis Bengtsson, 2014
 Scythris griseella Bengtsson, 2014
 Scythris hanseni Bengtsson, 2014
 Scythris helskloofensis Bengtsson, 2014
 Scythris heniaeguttella Bengtsson, 2014
 Scythris hermanusensis Bengtsson, 2014
 Scythris hirudoformis Bengtsson, 2014
 Scythris humeriformis Bengtsson, 2014
 Scythris jacobseni Bengtsson, 2014
 Scythris jamakensis Bengtsson, 2014
 Scythris jansei Bengtsson, 2014
 Scythris jodhpursoides Bengtsson, 2016
 Scythris jurateae Bengtsson, 2014
 Scythris kalaharii Bengtsson, 2014
 Scythris kalkrandensis Bengtsson, 2014
 Scythris kavangensis Bengtsson, 2014
 Scythris kihondensis Bengtsson, 2014
 Scythris kilifiensis Bengtsson, 2014
 Scythris kingstoni Bengtsson, 2014
 Scythris krooni Bengtsson, 2014
 Scythris kruegeri Bengtsson, 2014
 Scythris lactifuscella Bengtsson, 2014
 Scythris lahaivora Bengtsson, 2014
 Scythris leifi Bengtsson, 2014
 Scythris lushotensis Bengtsson, 2014
 Scythris magnipedella Bengtsson, 2014
 Scythris malawica Bengtsson, 2014
 Scythris malelanensis Bengtsson, 2014
 Scythris marginifuscella Bengtsson, 2014
 Scythris matopensis Bengtsson, 2014
 Scythris messinensis Bengtsson, 2014
 Scythris meyeri Bengtsson, 2014
 Scythris meyi Bengtsson, 2014
 Scythris mpalensis Bengtsson, 2014
 Scythris mulanjensis Bengtsson, 2014
 Scythris munroi Bengtsson, 2014
 Scythris naivashensis Bengtsson, 2014
 Scythris najaoides Bengtsson, 2014
 Scythris naukluftensis Bengtsson, 2014
 Scythris nguliae Bengtsson, 2014
 Scythris niniae Bengtsson, 2014
 Scythris nussi Bengtsson, 2014
 Scythris nyangensis Bengtsson, 2014
 Scythris nyikensis Bengtsson, 2014
 Scythris nylstroomensis Bengtsson, 2014
 Scythris nylsvleyensis Bengtsson, 2014
 Scythris obnubilella Bengtsson, 2014
 Scythris ochrocrusella Bengtsson, 2014
 Scythris ochroplicella Bengtsson, 2014
 Scythris octocornella Bengtsson, 2014

 Scythris oculella Bengtsson, 2014
 Scythris otaviensis Bengtsson, 2014
 Scythris paarlensis Bengtsson, 2014
 Scythris palmwagensis Bengtsson, 2014
 Scythris piriensis Bengtsson, 2014
 Scythris piriformis Bengtsson, 2014
 Scythris popensis Bengtsson, 2014
 Scythris potgieteri Bengtsson, 2014
 Scythris pravitella Bengtsson, 2014
 Scythris pretoriensis Bengtsson, 2014
 Scythris pulveratella Bengtsson, 2014
 Scythris quadrilobella Bengtsson, 2014
 Scythris rumurutiensis Bengtsson, 2014
 Scythris satarensis Bengtsson, 2014
 Scythris scholzi Bengtsson, 2014
 Scythris schouteni Bengtsson, 2014
 Scythris sericiella Bengtsson, 2014
 Scythris serinusoides Bengtsson, 2014
 Scythris setaelongella Bengtsson, 2014
 Scythris shingwedziensis Bengtsson, 2014
 Scythris silfverbergi Bengtsson, 2014
 Scythris simplicella Bengtsson, 2014
 Scythris skukuzensis Bengtsson, 2014
 Scythris snymani Bengtsson, 2014
 Scythris solutella Bengtsson, 2014
 Scythris somangensis Bengtsson, 2014
 Scythris stoltzei Bengtsson, 2014
 Scythris strydomi Bengtsson, 2014
 Scythris subconcurrens Bengtsson, 2014
 Scythris subcurvipilella Bengtsson, 2014
 Scythris subgriseella Bengtsson, 2014
 Scythris subnigropterella Bengtsson, 2014
 Scythris subroseola Bengtsson, 2014
 Scythris thikensis Bengtsson, 2014
 Scythris thoracifaciella Bengtsson, 2014
 Scythris tubulella Bengtsson, 2014
 Scythris turiensis Bengtsson, 2014
 Scythris ugabensis Bengtsson, 2014
 Scythris ugandica Bengtsson, 2014
 Scythris umtaliensis Bengtsson, 2014
 Scythris unciclavella Bengtsson, 2014
 Scythris valvaerimella Bengtsson, 2014
 Scythris vanderwolfi Bengtsson, 2014
 Scythris varii Bengtsson, 2014
 Scythris virgaeformis Bengtsson, 2014
 Scythris wankiensis Bengtsson, 2014
 Scythris waterbergensis Bengtsson, 2014
 Scythris wolframi Bengtsson, 2014
 Scythris worcesterensis Bengtsson, 2014
 Scythris zimbabwensis Bengtsson, 2014

Selected former species

 Scythris ammobia Falkovitsh, 1972
 Scythris annae Bengtsson, 1997
 Scythris aphanatma Meyrick, 1933
 Scythris asema Falkovitsh, 1972
 Scythris asthena Falkovitsh, 1972
 Scythris badiella Bengtsson, 2002
 Scythris calciflua Meyrick, 1921

 Scythris canispersa Meyrick, 1913
 Scythris erudita Meyrick, 1917
 Scythris fluctuosa Meyrick, 1914
 Scythris homoxantha Meyrick, 1921
 Scythris hypolepta Falkovitsh, 1972
 Scythris melanopleura Meyrick, 1914

 Scythris meligastra Meyrick, 1920
 Scythris mongholica Passerin d'Entrèves & Roggero, 2006
 Scythris pediculella Bengtsson, 1997
 Scythris physalis Falkovitsh, 1972
 Scythris psamathota Meyrick, 1913
 Scythris zylinochra'' Meyrick, 1931

Footnotes

References

  (2008): Australian Faunal Directory – Scythris. Version of 9 October 2008. Retrieved 1 May 2010.
  (2009): Scythris. Version 2.1, 22 December 2009. Retrieved 1 May 2010.
  (2004): Butterflies and Moths of the World, Generic Names and their Type-species – Scythris. Version of 5 November 2004. Retrieved 1 May 2010.
  (2008): Markku Savela's Lepidoptera and some other life forms – Scythris. Version of 17 July 2008. Retrieved 1 May 2010.
  (2009): Xyloryctidae. Version of 1 May 2008. Retrieved 30 April 2010.

 
Scythrididae
Taxa named by Jacob Hübner